The 2021 Tuvalu A-Division was the 21st season of top flight association football in Tuvalu. The season started in 6 March and finished on 17 April 2021.

Participating Clubs

The 2021 edition of the A-Division was played between 8 teams:

FC Manu Laeva (Nukulaelae)
Ha'apai United (Nanumaga)
FC Niutao (Niutao)
FC Tofaga (Vaitupu)
Lakena United (Nanumea)
Nauti FC (Funafuti)
Tamanuku (Nukufetau)
Vaoloa FC (Nui)

League table

Results

Round 1
Matches for round 1 were held on March 6:

Niutao          -  Tamanuku      
Nauti          0-1 Tofaga 
Lakena United   -  Vaoloa   
Ha'apai         -  Manu Laeva

Round 2
Matches for round 1 were held on March 13:

Ha'apai         -  Tamanuku 
Manu Laeva      -  Vaoloa
Nauti           -  Niutao
Lakena United  1-4 Tofaga

Round 3
Matches for round 1 were held on March 20:

Nauti           -  Lakena United
Ha'apai         -  Niutao
Manu Laeva     1-2 Tofaga
Vaoloa          -  Tamanuku

Round 4
Matches for round 1 were held on March 27:

Vaoloa          -  Niutao
Tamanuku       0-3 Tofaga
Nauti           -  Ha'apai
Manu Laeva      -  Lakena United

Round 5
Matches for round 1 were held on April 3:

Nauti           -  Manu Laeva
Vaoloa          -  Ha'apai
Tamanuku        -  Lakena United
Tofaga        16-0 Niutao

Round 6
Matches for round 1 were held on April 10:

Tofaga         4-2 Ha'apai
Niutao          -  Lakena United
Tamanuku        -  Manu Laeva
Nauti           -  Vaoloa

Round 7
Matches for round 1 were held on April 17:

Nauti           -  Tamanuku
Tofaga         6-0 Vaoloa
Lakena United   -  Ha'apai
Niutao          -  Manu Laeva

References

External links 
 tnfa.tv
 vriendenvantuvalu.nl 
 soccerway.com

Tuvalu A-Division seasons
1